Gazey Nunatak (‘Nunatak Gazey’ \'nu-na-tak ga-'zey\) is the partly ice-covered ridge extending 2.9 km in north-south direction and 830 m wide, with a central height rising to 770 m and northern one of 776 m in Coulter Glacier, Havre Mountains in northern Alexander Island, Antarctica. The feature is named after Gazey Peak in Pirin Mountains, Bulgaria.

Location

Maps
 British Antarctic Territory. Scale 1:200000 topographic map. DOS 610 – W 69 70. Tolworth, UK, 1971
 Antarctic Digital Database (ADD). Scale 1:250000 topographic map of Antarctica. Scientific Committee on Antarctic Research (SCAR). Since 1993, regularly upgraded and updated

Notes

References
 Bulgarian Antarctic Gazetteer. Antarctic Place-names Commission. (details in Bulgarian, basic data in English)
 Gazey Nunatak. SCAR Composite Gazetteer of Antarctica

External links
 Gazey Nunatak. Copernix satellite image

Nunataks of Alexander Island
Bulgaria and the Antarctic